Lentini is a place in Sicily.

People called Lentini:

 Domenico Lentini, Blessed (1770−1828), Italian Roman Catholic priest
 Fehlandt Lentini (born 1977), former American professional baseball player
 Frank Lentini (1889−1966), Italian-American sideshow performer with three legs, who toured with numerous circuses
 Gianluigi Lentini (born 1969), former Italian professional footballer 
 Giacomo da Lentini (first half of 13th century), senior poet of the Sicilian School and notary at the court of the Holy Roman Emperor Frederick II
 Giovanni Lentini the Elder (1830−1898),  Italian painter and scenic designer
 James Lentini (born 1958), American composer, guitarist, and academic administrator
 Licinia Lentini (born 1959), Italian actress and television personality
 Marie-Hélène Lentini (born circa 1965), French actress and comedian
 Ramón Lentini (born 1988), Argentine football striker
 Rocco Lentini (1858−1953), Italian painter, responsible for the ceiling decorations of the Teatro Massimo in Palermo.
 Stefano Lentini (born 1974), music composer based in Rome

See also 
 Lago di Lentini, in the Province of Siracusa, Sicily, Italy